Gnissau is a small village in the district Ostholstein in Schleswig-Holstein, Germany, part of the municipality of Ahrensbök. It is situated half-way between Bad Segeberg and the Baltic Sea. About 850 people live in Gnissau.

External links
Gnissau.de

Villages in Schleswig-Holstein